Mykola Lemyk (4 April 1914 in Soloviy, Galicia – October 1941 in Myrhorod, Soviet Union, now Ukraine) was a Ukrainian political activist and leader of the Organization of Ukrainian Nationalists (OUN).

Biography 
After completing Gymnasium (school) he studied law at Lviv University and joined the youth branch of the Organization of Ukrainian Nationalists (OUN) in the early 1930s.

On 21 October 1933 he was ordered by the OUN to assassinate Alexei Mailov, OGPU agent and Secretary of the Soviet Union's consulate in Lviv, which was then under Polish administration. This political assassination was to publicize and to protest against the Holodomor the 1931–1932 famine/Ukrainian genocide where millions of Ukrainians died, but which was covered-up by the Soviet Government.

In December 1933, the Polish court in Lviv sentenced Lemyk to death, which was later commuted to life imprisonment. At the outset of World War II in 1939 Lemyk was freed from jail, and on 4 August 1940 he married Liuba Voznyak.

From 1941 Lemyk was in the regional command of the OUN-M — the faction supporting Andriy Melnyk, in Eastern Ukraine. In the fall of 1941 he led the Central Committee of the OUN. In October 1941 Lemyk was arrested by the Gestapo in Myrhorod (which was then occupied by Nazi Germany), and shot (other sources state that he was hanged by the Gestapo).

Notes

External links
Микола Лемик "Mykola Lemyk" 
Інтерв’ю Люби Євгенівни ВОЗНЯК-ЛЕМИК "Interview with Liuba Voznyak-Lemyk" 

Organization of Ukrainian Nationalists
Holodomor
1914 births
1941 deaths
People from Lviv Oblast
Ukrainian nationalists
Ukrainian people executed by Nazi Germany
Ukrainian assassins
Prisoners sentenced to death by Poland